The 1988–89 season was the 94th in the history of Arsenal Football Club. It began on 1 July 1988 and concluded on 30 June 1989, with competitive matches played between August and May. The club ended its 18-year wait for the league title by winning the Football League First Division championship in the most closely fought title race in the competition's history. Arsenal beat Liverpool 2–0 in the final match of the season to take the title on goals scored, as both clubs shared the same points total and goal difference. During the season Arsenal also enjoyed success in the Football League Centenary Trophy, but exited the League Cup to Liverpool in the third round and fell at the same stage of the FA Cup to West Ham United.

Earlier in the year manager George Graham had started to assemble a squad with a blend of youth and experience. Having already signed defenders Steve Bould and Lee Dixon, he set about trimming the squad letting Steve Williams and Kenny Sansom leave. Arsenal were not considered favourites for the league title at the start of the season, but a 5–1 win away at Wimbledon on the opening day led to talk over their chances. They continued their fine start to the campaign, particularly away from home and led the table from the Christmas period. At one stage Arsenal were 11 points clear of Liverpool, but a series of draws and surprising defeats allowed the gap to be closed. By the time Arsenal faced Liverpool on the final day, they were faced with an improbable challenge – winning by a two-goal margin against the defending champions to claim the title. Graham's cautious approach paid dividends as Arsenal led after the break, and deep into stoppage time midfielder Michael Thomas scored the all-important second goal.

17 different players represented Arsenal in four competitions and there were 14 different goalscorers. Arsenal's top goalscorer was Alan Smith, who scored 25 goals in 46 appearances. Smith and David Rocastle were the only Arsenal representatives in the PFA Team of the Year. Forward Paul Merson was named the PFA Young Player of the Year, an award voted for by his fellow peers. Once the league season finished, Arsenal players and staff paraded the trophy before a crowd of 250,000 on their way to a civic reception.

Background

In May 1986, George Graham was appointed as Arsenal manager. He made an instant impact, guiding his team to League Cup success, and the club finished fourth in the Football League First Division. Arsenal however slipped to sixth in the league the following season, and lost out to Luton Town in the League Cup final a year later. Graham sought to resolve inconsistencies by freshening up his squad, promoting number of academy graduates while selling ageing players. By the summer of 1988, he achieved a blend of youth and experience, but little was thought of Arsenal's chances of winning the First Division.

Transfers
Arsenal sold a number of fringe players throughout the season so Graham could freshen the squad with new players. Having already signed Lee Dixon and Steve Bould from Stoke City, defender Kenny Sansom became surplus to requirement and eventually joined Newcastle United. Steve Williams was sold to Luton Town for £300,000 in June 1988. as the player felt first-team opportunities were scarce; the fee Luton paid was £100,000 less than Arsenal originally wanted. Graham Rix went to Caen on a free transfer. Other transfers saw Rhys Wilmot leave the club he joined as a trainee in 1977 after failing to displace John Lukic as first choice, and Andy Marriott left to join Brian Clough's Nottingham Forest in a deal worth £50,000.

Out

Loan out

Pre-season and friendlies

Football League First Division

A total of 20 teams competed in the First Division in the 1988–89 season. Each team played 38 matches; two against every other team and one match at each club's stadium. Three points were awarded for each win, one point per draw, and none for defeats.

August–November

Arsenal began the league season away at Plough Lane, where they faced Wimbledon on 27 August 1988. The team started badly, going a goal behind after eight minutes but came back to win 5–1 with Alan Smith scoring a hat-trick. The manner of Arsenal's comeback had journalist Dennis Signy mulling over the club's chances of winning the league; he wrote in his Times match report: "…the Gunners made the bookmakers' odds of 16–1 against them for the championship look generous." At Highbury, Arsenal were beaten by newly promoted Aston Villa; for much of the first half Graham's side struggled to break through Villa's back five. The visitors were two goals up in the match before Arsenal equalised in the space of ten minutes. Andy Gray scored the winner in the 62nd minute from a free-kick contentiously awarded by the referee. Arsenal then faced Tottenham Hotspur in the season's first North London Derby, staged at White Hart Lane. A fast-paced and open first-half saw five goals in 17 minutes with Arsenal running out 3–2 winners. Graham later described it a "great" and "wonderful advertisement for the game," and felt the supporters and media would go away happy. Arsenal's home form continued to blight them as the team dropped two points against Southampton on 17 September 1988. The match was best remembered for an altercation between Paul Davis and Glenn Cockerill. The Arsenal midfielder punched Cockerill which was missed by the referee, but caught on camera. Davis was later banned for nine matches and handed a record £3,000 fine. Arsenal ended the month with a 2–1 defeat away to Sheffield Wednesday and sat in seventh position.

"He's anaemic, but he's leading the line superbly," was Graham's assessment of Smith as the striker scored two goals in Arsenal's 4–1 win at West Ham United. David Rocastle and Michael Thomas were the other goalscorers, contributing to the team's 13 league goals in four away matches. Goals from Adams and Smith saw Arsenal defeat Queens Park Rangers at home two weeks later, but they were held to a 1–1 draw at Luton Town despite dominating much of the game. Adams scored his second league goal of the season, at home to Coventry City to earn three points for the team. They also extended their unbeaten run in all competitions to seven matches. Kevin Richardson and Brian Marwood were singled out for praise by journalist Vince Wright, with the former "doing an excellent job on [David] Speedie," and the latter seemingly "involved in every penetrating move."

A live match audience witnessed Arsenal trounce Nottingham Forest at the City Ground in early November. Steve Bould, Brian Marwood, Adams and Smith each scored as the team came back from a goal behind to win. "It was a performance of true quality which must have made excellent viewing," was Graham's verdict and he described it as "satisfying" to beat Forest at their home ground. Arsenal were not at their fluent best against Newcastle United though came away from St James' Park with a clean sheet and a 1–0 win – Bould scored for the second successive match. Paul Merson scored twice against Middlesbrough as Arsenal recorded a 3–0 win and moved into second place, just two points behind Norwich City. Arsenal's five England internationals, who featured against Saudi Arabia a week before, were lauded in The Times for their performances, despite playing tamely for country. The match reporter suggested the club versus country dilemma could be solved by including more Arsenal players, something Graham was sceptical about when put to him. "I want England to do very well. It's just I want Arsenal to do better," he said. Arsenal's unbeaten run came to an end against Derby County, where at the Baseball Ground a debatable penalty was awarded to the home side which allowed them to get back into the game.

December–February
The visit of champions Liverpool in early December was seen by Graham and the media as a test of Arsenal's championship credentials. Arsenal entered the match boasting the division's best attacking record, while Liverpool conceded the fewest in the competition. In the game Liverpool went ahead through left winger John Barnes, but their lead was short lived as Smith equalised. Both sides spurned chances to win the game late on and the score stayed 1–1 at full time; Kenny Dalglish, the Liverpool player-manager however was delighted with a point and said afterwards: "That was as entertaining as any of the other four games we have played against each other this season." Arsenal failed to score for the first time in the season when they played league leaders Norwich City on 10 December 1988. The team returned to winning ways during the Christmas period. More than 37,000 spectators saw Arsenal defeat Manchester United by two goals to one, and on Boxing Day a brace from Marwood ensured Arsenal beat Charlton Athletic to go top of the league table. They continued their good form on New Year's Eve, beating Aston Villa 3–0.

The Highbury clock was unveiled in an elevated position before the game against Tottenham Hotspur as part of the ground's refurbishment work. Merson and Thomas scored a goal apiece against their bitter rivals, handing the team a fourth straight league win and send them two points clear of Norwich City. Match reporter Clive White conceded Tottenham had a legitimate claim for a penalty in the first half, but felt they never merited anything from the game, contrasting the visitor's disappointing play to Arsenal – "the epitome of pure, free-flowing football." The team continued their good away form by taking apart Everton at Goodison Park. Graham labelled his team as "nice and solid" after a goalless first half and the visitors sprung to life in the second, scoring three goals. Richardson, scorer of Arsenal's third, assessed the squad was more experienced than last year, adding "Everybody knows what they have to do." Arsenal failed to record a sixth straight win as Sheffield Wednesday held on for a 1–1 draw at Highbury the following weekend.

Victory against West Ham United moved Arsenal 10 points clear of third-place Coventry City and significantly ahead of defending champions Liverpool. The team came from behind against Millwall to seal another win. Their performance up until the second half was insipid, and after the interval they did as their manager asked and "upped their tempo" in search of an equaliser. Marwood eventually scored and the midfielder had a part to play in Smith getting the winning goal. Arsenal dropped two points away to Queens Park Rangers and were beaten by Coventry City – Bould conceded a late second-half penalty which was converted by Brian Kilcline. John Sillett, the manager of Coventry City felt pressure on Arsenal was "beginning to tell on them" and wanted to exploit that. Smith and Perry Groves each scored in Arsenal's 2–0 win against Luton Town, but February ended with a goalless draw at home to Millwall. Doubts were raised over Arsenal's championship credentials as Millwall successfully nullified their opponents' attacking threat. The visitors' own attacking duo – Teddy Sheringham and Tony Cascarino got the better of a struggling Adams, who was fortunate not to have conceded a penalty in the first half. Though Arsenal remained in first place after 27 matches, the gap built at the start of the calendar year was diminishing.

March–May

Arsenal's limitations were laid bare at home to Nottingham Forest as they were beaten 3–1. Clough's team, "the supreme masters of the counter-attack", produced a first-half performance of quality and hit the hosts on the break to score three times. Arsenal's form dipped as they drew 2–2 with Charlton Athletic, leaving themselves 11 points behind Liverpool who had three games in hand. Davis returned to the line-up for only his third league start since October, and made a noticeable difference, "restor[ing] Arsenal's confidence" and gave their attack "imagination." He put Arsenal 2–1 up in the match, but Charlton equalised when Steve MacKenzie raced into the penalty area and from the right unleashed a shot that bobbled over Lukic.

Consecutive away fixtures brought mixed results; Arsenal beat Southampton 3–1 before drawing one-all at Old Trafford against Manchester United. Adams, a target for jeers by the crowd, had scored at both ends. The day after the game he saw a picture of himself on the back page of the Daily Mirror with donkey ears. The jibes affected Adams privately, but he later recollected how it motivated him to "play that much better." Arsenal strengthened their position at the top of the table with four straight wins, conceding no goals. Lee Dixon and Niall Quinn each scored against Everton and the team then beat Newcastle United by a single goal. It was a "nervous" performance and "hardly the stuff of potential champions," reflected by the narrow scoreline, though the team did create notable chances throughout the game. Richardson and Marwood were denied by last-ditch tackles, interventions and goalkeeping saves.

Arsenal turned on the style against Norwich City a few weeks later, recording their biggest win of the season. Smith, Thomas, Rocastle and
Nigel Winterburn were all on the scoresheet and the 5–0 victory opened up a six-point gap at the top of the table. The Guardian correspondent David Lacey opined that the combination play between Smith and Merson was "crucial to Arsenal's momentum" as was Rocastle's athleticism down the right. Martin Hayes made a rare start for Arsenal and crucially scored the winner against Middlesbrough, all but relegating the North-East side. The absence of Davis, out with an injury, was felt as Arsenal unexpectedly lost at home to Derby County. In their final home match of the season Arsenal were held to a 2–2 draw by Wimbledon, paving the way for Liverpool to leapfrog them into first place and move three points clear. With one game remaining, Arsenal's title chances were as good as over.

Title decider

Arsenal's final match of the league season – against Liverpool, was originally scheduled a month earlier, but the events at Hillsborough, which saw 96 of Liverpool's supporters crushed to death in a stadium disaster, meant the game was postponed and rearranged. By the time the fixture drew ever closer, both clubs were close enough on points for it to act as a title decider; the odds however were against Arsenal as they had not won at Anfield in 15 years. Liverpool moreover had not lost by two goals – the margin Arsenal required to win the championship – in three years.

The game took place on a Friday evening and was televised to a national audience of over 12 million. Graham made a slight adjustment to his team's formation, bringing David O'Leary in to play as a sweeper in a back five. His thinking was to nullify Liverpool's attacking threat and for much of the first half, Arsenal stemmed their opponents' usual passing game. In the second half, Smith scored, but it looked increasingly likely the title would remain at Anfield as Arsenal struggled to increase their lead. However, deep into stoppage time, Thomas evaded a challenge by Steve Nicol and raced into the penalty area, before slipping the ball past advancing Bruce Grobbelaar to make the score 2–0. The final whistle was blown seconds later, ending Arsenal's 18-year wait to be crowned league champions. Described as "the most dramatic finish in the 120-year history of the English top flight" by BBC Sport in 2008, the title decider at Anfield generated interest in the sport and the events were depicted in Nick Hornby's best-selling book Fever Pitch.

Results

Classification

Results summary

Results by round

FA Cup

Arsenal entered the FA Cup in the third round (last 64), in which they were drawn to face fellow First Division club West Ham United away from home. Their time in the competition was brief; Arsenal resiliently came from two goals down at Upton Park to force a replay, but they lost the tie at home by a single goal. Graham commended West Ham's approach afterwards, admitting they had done "...a very good job on us. They stopped us scoring and hoped they would nick one."

Match results
Key

In result column, Arsenal's score shown first
H = Home match
A = Away match

pen. = Penalty kick
o.g. = Own goal

Football League Cup

Arsenal entered the Football League Cup in the second round, where they were drawn against Hull City in a two-legged tie. At Boothferry Park, Marwood scored against his former side in a 2–1 win. Arsenal made light work of the second leg, where at Highbury Smith scored twice to make certain of progress into the fourth round. It was at that stage the team exited the competition, against Liverpool. The original tie at Anfield ended in a 1–1 draw, which meant it was replayed at Highbury. Both sides failed to convert their chances over 90 minutes, resulting in a second replay at Villa Park. Merson opened the scoring, before Steve McMahon brought Liverpool level and then his teammate John Aldridge got their second to knock Arsenal out of the competition.

Match results
Key

In result column, Arsenal's score shown first
H = Home match
A = Away match
N = Neutral match

pen. = Penalty kick
o.g. = Own goal

Football League Centenary Trophy

The Football League Centenary Trophy was held during the 1988–89 season to celebrate the 100th birthday of the Football League. It was a knockout competition, between the top eight sides from the 1987–88 First Division. In the quarter-final stage, Arsenal played Queens Park Rangers. Goals from Adams and Marwood were enough to send the club into the following round, where they then faced a makeshift Liverpool side at home. Arsenal took the lead in the tie, when Groves scored, but with 10 minutes of normal time remaining Steve Staunton equalised for the visitors. Arsenal quickly regained the lead however when Marwood's volley looped over goalkeeper Mike Hooper and into the net.

The final, staged at Villa Park, pitted Arsenal against Manchester United. Arsenal raced into a 2–0 lead before half-time, but United finished the game strongly and Clayton Blackmore scored to make it a tense finale. Graham's side however held on for the trophy, and the club also received a prize fund of £50,000.

Squad statistics
Arsenal used a total of 17 players during the 1988–89 season and there were 14 different goalscorers. Thomas featured in 47 matches – the most of any Arsenal player in the campaign. Lukic, Winterburn and Rocastle started in all 38 league matches. The team scored a total of 87 goals in all competitions. The top goalscorer was Smith, with 25 goals – 23 of which were scored in the league.

Smith and Rocastle were the only Arsenal players named in the PFA Team of the Year for 1988–89; for Rocastle, it was his second consecutive appearance, as he featured in the line up a season ago.  Merson was awarded the PFA Young Player of the Year in April 1989, an award voted by his fellow peers and professionals. The ceremony, which was held at London's Hilton Hotel, took place a day after the Hillsborough tragedy. A minute's silence was held and pre-planned extravaganzas were cancelled in respect.

Key

No. = Squad number

Pos = Playing position

Nat. = Nationality

Apps = Appearances

GK = Goalkeeper

DF = Defender

MF = Midfielder

FW = Forward

Source:

See also

 1988–89 in English football
 List of Arsenal F.C. seasons

References
General

Specific

Further reading

External links
 ArseWeb: Anfield 89

Arsenal F.C. seasons
Arsenal
English football championship-winning seasons